The 1934 FIFA World Cup was an international football tournament that was held in Italy from 27 May to 10 June 1934. Below are the squads registered by the 16 national teams involved in the tournament.

Brazil and Czechoslovakia were the only teams to have players from foreign clubs.

Rosters include reserves, alternates, and pre-selected players that may have participated in qualifiers and/or pre-tournament friendlies but not in the finals themselves.

Argentina
Head coach:  Felipe Pascucci

Austria
Head coach: Hugo Meisl

Although registered to the official list, Raftl, Janda, Stroh, Kaburek, Walzhofer and Hassmann remained on standby in Austria.

Belgium
Head coach: Hector Goetinck

Although registered to the official list, Bourgeois, Simons, Van Ingelgem, Lamoot, Ledent, Putmans, Versyp and Brichaut remained on standby in Belgium.

Brazil
Head coach: Luiz Vinhaes

Although registered to the official list, Pamplona and Domingos remained on standby in Brazil.

Czechoslovakia
Head coach: Karel Petrů

Although registered to the official list Daučík, Srbek, Šterc and Šimperský remained on standby in Czechoslovakia.

Egypt
Head coach:  James McCrae

Although registered to the official list, Bakhati, El-Soury and Youssef remained on standby in Egypt.

France
Head coach:  George Kimpton

Although registered to the official list, Défossé, Vandooren, Beaucourt, Delmer, Korb, Laurent and Courtois remained on standby in France.

Germany
Head coach: Otto Nerz

Although registered to the official list, Buchloh, Münzenberg, Albrecht, Dienert and Streb remained on standby in Germany.

Hungary
Head coach: Ödön Nádas

Italy
Head coach: Vittorio Pozzo

Netherlands
Head coach:  Bob Glendenning

Although registered to the official list, Vrauwdeunt and Paauwe remained on standby in the Netherlands.

Romania
Head coach: Josef Uridil and Costel Rădulescu

The Romanian Football Federation had nominated Zoltán Beke in case Bindea did not recover in time from injury, but this contravened FIFA regulations and so Beke, who travelled with the team to Italy, was not eligible to play.

Although registered to the official list, Konrard, Bürger, Juhász, Weichelt, Baratky, Klimek and Schwartz remained on standby in Romania.

Spain
Head coach: Amadeo García

Although registered to the official list, Hilario and Sabater remained on standby in Spain.

Sweden
Although registered to the official list, Hult, Jansson, Bunke, Holmberg and Lundhal remained on standby in Sweden.

Switzerland
Head coach: Heinrich Müller

Although registered to the official list, Huber, Gobet, Loichot and Hochsträsser remained on standby in Switzerland.

United States
Head coach: David Gould

References

External links
 1934 FIFA World Cup squads at Weltfussball.de

Squads
FIFA World Cup squads